The arrondissement of Saint-Laurent-du-Maroni is an arrondissement of France in French Guiana department in French Guiana region. It has eight communes.

Composition

The communes of the arrondissement of Saint-Laurent-du-Maroni, and their INSEE codes, are:

 Apatou (97360)
 Awala-Yalimapo (97361)
 Grand-Santi (97357)
 Mana (97306)
 Maripasoula (97353)
 Papaïchton (97362)
 Saint-Laurent-du-Maroni (97311)
 Saül (97352)

History

The arrondissement of Saint-Laurent-du-Maroni was established in 1969.

Before 2015, the arrondissements of French Guiana were subdivided into cantons. The cantons of the arrondissement of Saint-Laurent-du-Maroni were, as of January 2015:

 Mana
 Maripasoula
 Saint-Laurent-du-Maroni

See also
 Montagne d'Or mine

References

Saint-Laurent-du-Maroni